The Central Maine & Québec Railway  was a Class II freight railroad operating in the U.S. states of Maine and Vermont and the Canadian province of Quebec with headquarters in Bangor, Maine.  It was owned by Railroad Acquisition Holdings, LLC, a subsidiary of Fortress Investment Group, LLC. It is now a subsidiary of Canadian Pacific Railway since June 2020.

Its United States operations were named the Central Maine & Québec Railway US Incorporated with offices in New York, NY, and were registered with the Surface Transportation Board on February 14, 2014.

Its Canadian operations were named the Central Maine and Québec Railway Canada Incorporated with offices in Sherbrooke, QC, and were registered with Revenue Québec on February 14, 2014.

History

The Montreal, Maine and Atlantic Railway , itself a product of the 2002 Iron Road Railways bankruptcy, filed for bankruptcy in the United States and Canada on August 7, 2013, following the fiery Lac-Mégantic rail disaster, in which a runaway crude oil train killed forty-seven people and caused an estimated $200 million in property damage to downtown Lac-Mégantic, Quebec. The company received protection under Chapter 11 of the United States Bankruptcy Code and under the Companies' Creditors Arrangement Act in Canada to oversee the sale of assets.

In December 2013, Fortress Investment Group, LLC, through its subsidiary Railroad Acquisition Holdings, LLC (RAH) placed a stalking horse bid on the operating rail lines, which was accepted by the bankruptcy trustee in January 2014.  In February 2014 RAH announced that it had formed the CMQ to become the operating entity of the rail lines and that the sale would be concluded in March 2014. CM&Q received its certificate of fitness from the Canadian Transportation Agency on June 24, 2014.

In March 2014, John E. Giles of RAH drove the length of the line, visiting communities and industries served by the railway and inspecting the condition of tracks and installations. He estimated a $10–20 million investment would be needed over three years to repair the rail line, then in poor condition and not safe for the transport of oil or dangerous goods.

In the same year, the CMQR acquired 10 GMD SD40-2Fs from Canadian Pacific Railway.

The company planned to resume transport of crude oil by rail in January 2016; however, this did not happen due to petroleum market conditions.

In 2017, CMQ took over operations of the former NS Hannibal Subdivision in Ohio from Norfolk Southern. The line services several Fortress owned industries at the former Long Ridge Energy Generation Facility in Clarington, Ohio. CIT owned SD40-2's 3053 and 3082 were assigned to operate the line. Crews were sent from Maine for a week at a time to operate trains. After the CP takeover, this operation was retained by Fortress Investment under the former CMQ subsidiary Katahdin Railcar Services.

On November 20, 2019, it was announced that Canadian Pacific Railway would purchase CMQ. Canadian Pacific's CEO, Keith Creel remarked that the acquisition would give CP a true coast-to-coast network across Canada and an increased presence in New England. This would result in several former CP rail lines in Maine and Quebec, which were sold over the years to CM&Q's predecessor railroads, being reacquired by CP.

On June 4, 2020, CP officially finalized its acquisition of CMQ.

Rockland Branch Operation
In September 2015, CMQ was selected by the Maine Department of Transportation to operate the state-owned Rockland Branch rail line between Brunswick and Rockland, taking over the line from previous operator Maine Eastern Railroad on January 1, 2016. The CMQ proposal did not include the operation of passenger excursions that had been operated by Maine Eastern, ending 11 years of successful passenger rail operations along the Maine coast.

At the end of August 2021, it was announced Finger Lakes Railway would take over operation of the Rockland Branch. Soon after the STB approved the transfer of operation, Dragon Cement, the largest shipper on the line, announced they would no longer ship cement out of its Rockland facility by the end of the year, ending the rail shuttle operation that makes up most of the revenue for this line.

Routes

CMQ owned and operated the following rail lines:

  Searsport Subdivision ( Northern Maine Junction, ME to Searsport, ME)
  Millinocket Subdivision ( Northern Maine Junction, ME to Millinocket, ME)
  East Millinocket Subdivision ( Millinocket, ME to East Millinocket, ME)
  Madawaska Subdivision ( Millinocket, ME to start of Maine Northern Railway )
  K.I. Subdivision ( Brownville, ME to Brownville Junction, ME)
  Moosehead Subdivision ( Brownville Junction, ME to Lac-Mégantic, QC)
  Sherbrooke Subdivision ( Lac-Mégantic, QC to Brookport, QC)
  Adirondack Subdivision ( Brookport, QC to St-Jean-sur-Richelieu, QC)
  Newport Subdivision ( Brookport, QC to Newport, VT)
  Stanbridge Subdivision ( Farnham, QC to Stanbridge, QC)
  St-Guillaume Subdivision ( Farnham, QC to Sainte-Rosalie, QC)
  Maine DOT Rockland Branch ( Rockland, ME to Brunswick, ME)
  Maine DOT Atlantic Branch ( Rockland, ME to Rockland, ME)
  Hannibal Subdivision 

   in Maine
   in Quebec
   in Vermont

Interchange points

Canadian National Railway 
 Saint-Jean-sur-Richelieu, QC
 Sainte-Rosalie, QC
Canadian Pacific Railway 
 Saint-Jean-sur-Richelieu, QC
Eastern Maine Railway 
 Brownville Junction, ME
Maine Northern Railway 
 Millinocket, ME
CSX Transportation 
 Northern Maine Junction, ME
 Brunswick, Maine
St. Lawrence and Atlantic Railroad  / 
 Lennoxville, QC
Washington County Railroad 
 Newport, VT

Failed expansions

When the Providence and Worcester Railroad  was listed for sale in 2016, Fortress Investment attempted to purchase the P&W, but ultimately Genesse and Wyoming  was the high bidder. Based on first-hand information from former CMQ employees, had the P&W been purchased the railroad would have retained its original name, while being a subsidiary of the CMQ.

Notes and references

See also

 Orford Express, an independently owned tourist train on part of the CM&QR line

External links
 

Former regional railroads in the United States
Defunct Maine railroads
Defunct Vermont railroads
Defunct Quebec railways
Companies based in Bangor, Maine
Predecessors of the Canadian Pacific Railway
Canadian Pacific Railway subsidiaries
Railway companies established in 2014
2014 establishments in New York (state)
American companies established in 2014
Railway companies disestablished in 2020
American companies disestablished in 2020
2020 disestablishments in New York (state)
Standard gauge railways in Canada